Ahoada (Ahuda, Ehuda) is a city in Orashi Region of Rivers State, Nigeria, located northwest of Port Harcourt.

External links
 Official Rivers State webpage

Cities in Rivers State